Denise Masino is an American professional female bodybuilder and model.

Early life and bodybuilding
Born in Brooklyn, New York of Puerto Rican descent, the 5'2" Masino won her pro card by winning the lightweight class at the 1995 NPC Nationals.  She competed as a professional through 2007, and was the 2003 Night of Champions winner.

Model career
Starting from early 1996, Masino was featured in various prominent fitness and bodybuilding magazines. She was a two-time centerfold in Flex Power & Sizzle and voted the "sexiest bodybuilder alive" by Iron Man magazine. She was also included in Flexs 1997 Annual Swimsuit issue and in their Fantasy Lingerie issue. In 1997, along with her then-husband and trainer Robert Masino, she founded Muscle Elegance, a magazine that features erotic pictorials of female bodybuilders and where Denise is featured as the main model. The magazine also produces a line of videos and the website Muscle Pinups.

Her feature film debut in the vampire movie, Blood + Kisses (originally titled Kiss of the Vampire as shown in trailers), premiered in film festivals in 2005, but so far remains unreleased. She is currently featured in the documentary feature, "Adventures of Miss Fit," which had its film festival premiere in 2016.

Personal life
Masino is a registered Republican who has voted out of party and identifies herself as a fiscal conservative. She is currently married to her husband Gregg, and was previously married to Robert Masino for fourteen years. She currently lives in Fort Myers, Florida.

Contest history
 1994 NPC Florida Championships - Overall winner
 1994 NPC Nationals - 8th (MW)
 1995 NPC Nationals - 1st (LW)
 1996 Jan Tana Classic - 6th
 1997 Jan Tana Classic - 6th
 1997 Ms. International - 13th
 1998 Jan Tana Classic - 8th
 1998 Ms. International - Disqualified
 1999 Ms. International - 7th
 1999 Pro World Championship - 4th
 2000 Ms. International - 4th (LW)
 2001 Ms. International - 5th (LW)
 2002 Ms. International - 6th (LW)
 2003 Ms. International - 2nd (LW)
 2003 Night of Champions - 1st (LW & Overall)
 2003 IFBB Ms. Olympia - 3rd (LW)
 2004 Ms. International - 3rd (LW)
 2004 IFBB Ms. Olympia - 2nd (LW)
 2007 Ms. International - 12th

See also

 List of Puerto Ricans

References

External links
 
 
Muscle Elegance magazine

American female bodybuilders
American sportspeople of Puerto Rican descent
Living people
Professional bodybuilders
Sportspeople from Brooklyn
Sportspeople from Fort Myers, Florida
Sportspeople from Los Angeles
Florida Republicans
Year of birth missing (living people)